Compton is an unincorporated community in Newton County, Arkansas, United States. Osage Creek flows past the west side of the community.

Compton has a post office with ZIP code 72624.

References

External links
 Newton County Historical Society

Unincorporated communities in Newton County, Arkansas
Unincorporated communities in Arkansas